Anthony "Tony" Carreiro (born April 6, 1954) is an American actor and performing arts professor.

Early life and education 
Born in Ithaca, New York, Carreiro graduated from Ithaca High School. He earned his Bachelor of Arts at Cornell University in 1982 and a Master of Fine Arts from the Professional Actor Training Program at the University of Washington in 1985.

Career 
Carreiro works as a professor of acting courses at Long Beach City College. He is a certified sword fighter and a fighting choreographer for theatrical works and films, as well as stage combat courses in colleges.

Television
He played a gay English professor in the sitcom Doctor Doctor. He has had numerous notable guest-starring roles on several television series, including Charmed, Matlock, and especially sitcoms such as Caroline in the City, Home Improvement, Ellen, Wings, and The Golden Girls, where he played a waiter (twice) as well as a doctor. He also appeared as Daphne's boyfriend, Joe, in two episodes of Frasier, and as Ken, the eponymous “Relief Bartender”, in a season four episode of Cheers. He played Matt Sullivan, Tia and Tamera's biological father, in the sitcom Sister, Sister.

Film 
He has also appeared in movies such as Lethal Weapon 2 (1989) and Liar Liar (1997).

Personal life 
He resides in Lake Balboa, California, with his wife Kathleen and daughter.

Filmography

Film

Television

References

External links 
 

Action choreographers
American male television actors
Cornell University alumni
Living people
Long Beach City College faculty
University of Washington School of Drama alumni
Ithaca High School (Ithaca, New York) alumni
1954 births